Arshad is an Arabic male given name and a surname. It means "the right path".

Notable people with the name include:

Given name
Arshad Ali (disambiguation), several people
Arshad Ayub (born 1958), Indian cricketer
Arshad Hasan, executive director at Democracy for America (DFA)
Arshad Hussain (born 1990), amateur Pakistani boxer
Arshad Laeeq (born 1970), Pakistani cricketer
Arshad Mehmood (composer), Pakistani actor, music composer and singer
Arshad Mehmood (singer), Pakistani singer
Arshad Pervez (born 1953), Pakistani cricketer
Arshad Sharif (born 1973), Pakistani journalist, writer and photographer
Arshad Warsi (born 1968), Indian actor

Surname
Abdul Rahman bin Arshad, Singaporean convicted robber and culprit of the 1994 Oriental Hotel murder case
Humza Arshad (born 1985), British-Pakistani actor, comedian, writer and YouTube personality
Joseph Arshad, (born 1964), Bishop of the Roman Catholic Diocese of Faisalabad
Muhammad Arshad (writer), Persian author of medieval Bengal
Muhammad Arshad Misbahi (born 1968), the Chair of AKSA (Al-Karam Scholars Association)
Sudirman Arshad (1954–1992), Malaysian singer and songwriter

See also
Ahad
Arad (disambiguation)
Arsha
Asad
Asha